Paradise Lost is the tenth studio album by British heavy metal band Paradise Lost. It was recorded between January and June 2004 at Chapel Studios, Lincolnshire and Hollypark Lane, Los Angeles; it was mixed and mastered at Green Jacket Studios.

This is the first album with Jeff Singer, who joined the band after the writing of the album was mostly finished and contributed to the creative process to a less extent than the follow-up, In Requiem.

The band had songs such as "Sedative God", which was written for this album but did not end up on any of the releases of this album (such as singles) but instead ended up on the In Requiem, while other songs such as "Through the Silence" and "Sanctimonious You", although not released on any of the reissues of this album, ended up being on the "Forever After" single CD and the B-Sides & Rarities album. The aforementioned single also has a music video.

Track listing

Forever After

Forever After is a maxi-single from the album.

Personnel

Paradise Lost
 Nick Holmes — vocals, lyrics
 Greg Mackintosh — lead guitar; keyboards, music
 Aaron Aedy — rhythm guitar
 Steve Edmondson — bass guitar
 Jeff Singer — drums

Guests
 Leah Randi - "choir-esque" chorus on "Forever After"
 Heather Thompson - backing vocals on "Forever After" and "Over The Madness"
Chris Elliot - keyboards and string arrangements 
Rhys Fulber - keyboards
Sam Scott-Hunter - photography
Greg Reely - audio recording, audio mixing and audio mastering 
Ewan Davies - assistant engineer
Will Bartle -  assistant engineer
Andy Farrow - management 
Vicky Langham - assisted management 
Seth Siro Anton (Septic Flesh) - album cover

Charts

References

Paradise Lost (band) albums
2005 albums
GUN Records albums
Albums with cover art by Spiros Antoniou
Albums produced by Rhys Fulber